Hooghly Ghat railway station is a small railway station in Hooghly district in the state of West Bengal. It is situated in the Naihati - Bandel Branch line. Its code is HYG. It serves Hooghly city. The station consists of two platforms, neither of which are well sheltered. It is raised on an elevated platform connecting the districts of Hooghly and Nadia via the Sampriti Bridge or Jubilee Bridge in the earlier years. It lacks water drinking stations and basic sanitation requirements.

Major trains 
 Muzaffarpur–Sealdah Fast Passenger (unreserved)
 Sealdah–Rampurhat Passenger (unreserved)
 Naihati–Bandel EMU locals

References

Railway stations in Hooghly district
Howrah railway division
Kolkata Suburban Railway stations